Fickert is a surname. Notable people with this surname include:

 Auguste Fickert (1855–1910), Austrian feminist
 Charles Fickert (1873–1937), American politician
 Christian Fickert (born 1981), German football player
 Joachim Fickert, German football coach
 Stephen Fickert, American football coach